Andreja Katič (born December 22, 1969 in Slovenj Gradec) is the former Minister of Justice of the Republic of Slovenia who served from September 2018 to March 2020 under Prime Minister Marjan Šarec.

Before serving as defence minister from 2015 to 2018, she was an employee at the municipality of Velenje. On 3 of February 2016 she approved the deployment of Slovenian troops in the Kurdish city of Erbil (Iraq), as part of international Military intervention against ISIL.

References

|-

1969 births
Living people
Female defence ministers
Female justice ministers
Defence ministers of Slovenia
Justice ministers of Slovenia
People from Slovenj Gradec
Social Democrats (Slovenia) politicians
University of Maribor alumni
Women government ministers of Slovenia